The Alameda and San Joaquin Railroad was incorporated on May 1, 1895, to serve the coal mines of the San Francisco & San Joaquin Coal Company at Corral Hollow.  The  line ran from Tesla (located in the Corral Hollow canyon southeast of Corral Hollow Pass) to  Carbona just south of Tracy and then up to Lathrop and Stockton.  The line was constructed in 1895. On July 25, 1903, the line was sold to the Western Pacific Railway (WP).

Route 
The line from Tesla to Carbona was abandoned by the WP in January 1916, however an April 1916 timetable continued to show that line.
Tesla (Corral Hollow)
Harrietville
Walden Pottery
Carnegie
Manganese
River Rock
Kerlinger
Carbona (near present-day Union Pacific CP F072)

The remainder of the line from Carbona to Stockton became the WP's mainline (today's Union Pacific) route from Tracy to Stockton.
Carbona
Tracy (CP F074)
Lyoth (CP F075)
Wyche (CP F082/F083)
Lathrop (CP F084/F087) Sharpe Army Depot
French Camp
Ortega (CP F090)
Stockton Yard (CP F091/F092)
Stockton Tower (CP F093)

References 

Defunct California railroads
History of the San Joaquin Valley
Predecessors of the Western Pacific Railroad
Railway companies established in 1895
Railway companies disestablished in 1903
Diablo Range
1895 establishments in California